USS Ochlockonee (AOG-33) was a Mettawee-class gasoline tanker acquired by the U.S. Navy for the dangerous task of transporting gasoline to warships in the fleet, and to remote Navy stations.

Ochlockonee, formerly MC Hull 1530, was laid down under a Maritime Commission contract 18 October 1944 by East Coast Shipyard, Inc., Bayonne, New Jersey; launched 19 November 1944; sponsored by Mrs. Albert Robinette; acquired by the Navy 18 December 1944; and commissioned 29 December.

World War II service 
 
Following shakedown in the Chesapeake Bay, Ochlockonee departed Norfolk 15 February 1945 for Hawaii via Aruba, the Panama Canal, and San Diego, California, arriving 14 April. Operating out of Pearl Harbor for the remainder of the war, Ochlockonee made fueling runs among the Hawaiians and to Johnston and Canton Islands.

Post-war decommissioning 
 
She decommissioned at San Pedro, California, 14 January 1946, and was struck from the Navy List 7 February. Returned to the Maritime Administration on 21 June, she subsequently entered merchant service and was named Texaco No. 10, later renamed Vincent Tibbetts until laid up in 2001. Final disposition: sunk as a deep water artificial reef, 5 September 2002, off the New Jersey coast.

Military awards and honors 

Ochlockonee’s crew was eligible for the following medals:
 American Campaign Medal
 Asiatic-Pacific Campaign Medal
 World War II Victory Medal

References

External links 
 NavSource Online: Service Ship Photo Archive - AOG-33 Ochlockonee

 

Mettawee-class gasoline tankers
Type T1-M-A2 tankers of the United States Navy
Ships built in Bayonne, New Jersey
1944 ships
World War II auxiliary ships of the United States